Saint Mary's Academy - Dominica (abbreviated as SMA) is an all-boy Catholic secondary school in Roseau, Dominica. SMA offers First Form through Fifth Form, which is generally followed by two years of non-compulsory further education – often at a Sixth Form College.

History

The founder of the school is Blessed Edmund Rice. Blessed Edmund Rice was given the Grace to respond to the call of Jesus by identifying with Christ in the poor. His example evoked a deep awareness of God's loving presence in all with whom he came in contact. He awakened within them consciousness of their dignity as children of God. He invited his followers to share his Gospel insight, and empowered them to reach out to the needy, especially the materially poor. The life of blessed Edmund Rice - businessman, husband, father, widower, religious brother, teacher and founder - challenges all involved in Christian brother Education to live and teach Gospel values in today's world. His charisma inspired the essential elements of a Christian Brother Education.

Mission statement

(For the St. Mary's Academy and all other Catholic Schools in Dominica).

Uniform

The Academy's uniform consists of a white shirt jack with the school's crest pinned to the breast pocket however the student desires. Brown khaki pants are worn, except for special occasions, like church masses, where black pants are worn. The sports uniforms are based on the different  houses the students belong to. They are :

Saint Francis - Blue Shirt with school crest and respective house name printed in white on the back as ST. FRANCIS

Saint Georges - Yellow Shirt with school crest and respective house name printed in white on the back as ST. GEORGES

Saint Micheals - Red Shirt with school crest and respective house name printed in white on the back as ST. MICHEALS

Saint Ignatius - Green Shirt with school crest and respective house name printed in white on the back as ST. IGNATIUS

Student Council

At the beginning of every school year that commences in September, student councils are chosen by the pupils. The party normally consists of a President, a Vice-President, a public relations officer (chief communications officer), treasurer, and a secretary.

Buildings
The S.M.A. compound consists of two main buildings, the Old Wing, and the New Wing (Brother Germain Wing). The Principal's office is located on the bottom floor of the Old Wing, and there are two staff rooms, one on the Old Wing, and another on the New Wing.
 
The Old Wing has only two floors. It is the main building of the school. On the bottom floor is the principal's office, the room's 101 to 105 and an old lab which is used for building technology. On the top floor is the staff room, then rooms 201 to 206. (All rooms respective from right to left.)

The New Wing is the latest addition to the compound. It was built in 1998, and was named after a past principal, Bro. Germain. The New Wing has three floors. The bottom floor has a library, the councilor's office, and a science lab. On the second floor is the lowest level class-room, WA5. Next, the New Staff-Room, then the computer lab. On the third floor is WA1, WA2, WA3, and WA4. (All rooms are respective from left to right.)

Educational institutions established in 1932
Education in Dominica
Educational organisations based in Dominica
1932 establishments in the British Empire